The 1974 Georgia Tech Yellow Jackets football team represented the Georgia Institute of Technology during the 1974 NCAA Division I football season. The Yellow Jackets were led by first-year head coach Pepper Rodgers, and played their home games at Grant Field in Atlanta.

Schedule

Sources:

References

Georgia Tech
Georgia Tech Yellow Jackets football seasons
Georgia Tech Yellow Jackets football